Orlinovsky is a rural locality (a khutor) in Terkinskoye Rural Settlement, Serafimovichsky District, Volgograd Oblast, Russia. The population was 171 as of 2010. There are 5 streets.

Geography 
Orlinovsky is located 57 km northeast of Serafimovich (the district's administrative centre) by road. Terkin is the nearest rural locality.

References 

Rural localities in Serafimovichsky District